Solariella tubula is a species of sea snail, a marine gastropod mollusk in the family Solariellidae.

Description
The size of the shell attains 5 mm.

Distribution
This marine species occurs in the following locations:
 United Kingdom Exclusive Economic Zone
 Atlantic Ocean: from Georgia to East Florida, USA

References

External links
 To Biodiversity Heritage Library (3 publications)
 To Encyclopedia of Life
 To USNM Invertebrate Zoology Mollusca Collection
 To USNM Invertebrate Zoology Mollusca Collection
 To ITIS
 To World Register of Marine Species

tubula